Palina may refer to the following people
Palina Pivavarava (born 1994), Belarusian track cyclist 
Palina Rojinski (born 1985), Russian-German television presenter, actress, model, and DJ
Irina Palina (born 1970), Russian table tennis player

See also
La Palina, a brand of American cigars